Camacho Cigars was founded in 1962 by Simon Camacho and acquired by the Eiroa family in 1995. Now part of the Oettinger Davidoff Group, Camacho Cigars is based in Danlí, Honduras, and specializes in authentic handmade Cuban seed cigars.
After being exiled from Cuba in 1961, Simon Camacho, who was originally from Cuba, began his cigar business in Miami, Florida. Simon Camacho’s cigars gained success in the United States, as well as abroad, and even found a fan in the company of British Prime Minister, Winston Churchill. Consequently, Camacho has since named one of its most popular cigars after Mr. Churchill. The vitola was developed in the Romeo Y Julieta factory in Cuba in approximately 1903. Production during this period reached 2 to 3 million cigars per year and the quantity continued to grow as the 1990s cigar boom years approached.

Acquisition 

Five years after the death of Simon Camacho, the company become acquired by the Eiroa family in 1995, and tobacco production was then transferred from Nicaragua to Honduras. In 1998, 26-year-old Christian Eiroa became the president of Caribe Imported Cigars, setting his years of experience from the family plantations in Honduras to good use.

By the turn of the millennium and with the launch of the Camacho Corojo, the Eiroa family and their ventures had joined the leagues of the leading players in the US cigar industry. In 2008, Camacho and its Rancho Jamastran factory in Danlí, Honduras sold to the Oettinger Davidoff Group, although the Eiroas maintained ownership of the Honduran tobacco fields.

Eiroa Family 

Generoso Eiroa had been growing tobacco in Cuba since the 1900s, but due to the wake of the Cuban Revolution and subsequent nationalization of the tobacco plantations, his widow and three sons were forced to leave the country and settle in Tampa, Florida  Eiroa's son, Julio Eiroa, joined the Bay of Pigs invasion attempt as one of a force of Cuban exiles with the US Army. While his brother, Generoso Jr. worked in Nicaragua, Julio traveled to Honduras in 1963 on behalf of tobacco dealer Angel Oliva. There, as part of a government-sponsored cultivation project, he laid the foundations for Camachos tobacco plantations belonging to the Eiroa family.

After his first year with the Oliva Family, Julio Eiroa decided to become an independent farmer. Julio Eiroa bought the government tobacco farms year after year. His decision changed helped kick-start the history of tobacco in Honduras. Through partnerships with companies such as Bering Cigars and US Tobacco, he would become the world’s largest Candela tobacco farmer by 1972. In 1987, Julio Eiroa founded Caribe Imported Cigars in Miami, Florida, which manufactures cigars and offers its products through dealers and retailers in the United States and internationally.

Company today 

After five years of adopting Bayer's standards for good agricultural and manufacturing practices, Camacho Cigars and Bayer CropScience signed a working partnership under the Bayer Food Management program. The new alliance established Camacho Cigars as the only tobacco company in history to comply with strict international standards for Good Manufacturing Practices and Good Agricultural Practices (GAP). By complying with the practices set forth by Bayer CropScience, Camacho Cigars ensures the responsible management of natural resources, bio-friendly pesticides, industrial safety, and biosecurity.

Camacho Cigars signed a three-year deal with the Orange Bowl and the NCAA for the 2012-2014 Orange Bowl games and the 2013 BCS National Championship. The sponsorship was pulled  after several public health organizations raised concern, saying tobacco promotions have no place in sports and shouldn't be allowed under federal tobacco marketing restrictions.

Brands

Core brands 

The cigars produced under the Camacho Brand:
 Baccarat "The Game" 
 LegendArio 
 La Fontana 
 Outdoorsman
 La Fontana Consigliere
 LegendArio Connecticut

Premium brands 

The Cigar Blends that make up the core of the Camacho Brand.
Camacho Corojo 
 Camacho Connecticut 
 Camacho Coyolar Puro 
 Camacho Ecuador
 Camacho Havana 
 Camacho SLR Maduro 
 Camacho Power Band
 Camacho Shellback
 Camacho Check Six
 Room 101 Original 
 Room 101 San Andres

Ultra premium brands 
The Limited Selections are available only at select retailers.
 Camacho Triple Maduro 
 Camacho Select
 Camacho 10th Anniversary 
 Camacho Diploma 
 Room 101 Conjura
 Room 101 Namakubi
 Room 101 OSOK
 Room 101 Liberty 2012
 Room 101 Daruma

See also
List of cigar brands

References

External links
 

Cigar brands
Cigar manufacturing companies
Manufacturing companies established in 1961
Companies of Honduras
Honduran brands
1961 establishments in Florida
1995 mergers and acquisitions